MV Northern Ranger was a Canadian ice-breaking coastal ferry operating in Newfoundland and Labrador. The ship entered service in 1986 for coastal service in Labrador. The vessel provided service between Nain, Newfoundland and Labrador and Happy Valley-Goose Bay, stopping at points between. The ferry was owned and operated by the province of Newfoundland and Labrador. At the end of 2018, the ship was taken out of service and replaced by a newer vessel on the route between Nain and Happy Valley-Goose Bay.

Description
The ship is powered by a diesel engine turning one screw. The vessel has capacity for 131 passengers and 100 tons of cargo.

Service history
The vessel was constructed by Port Weller Dockyards in St. Catharines, Ontario with the yard number 75. The ferry was launched on June 11, 1986 and completed in October later that year. Northern Ranger entered service in 1986 with Marine Atlantic. Northern Ranger is named after her predecessor, SS Northern Ranger, launched in Scotland in 1936 and operated by the Newfoundland Railway and later Canadian National Railways for thirty years.

In 1997, the Government of Newfoundland and Labrador took over all intraprovincial ferry service from the federal crown corporation in exchange for a one-time payment for highway construction and capital costs toward improving the ferry service. Northern Ranger was transferred from federal ownership under Transport Canada to that of the Department of Transportation and Works. The vessel was then operated by Nunatsiavut Marine Inc. (NMI).

The ferry offered weekly service from Happy Valley-Goose Bay to Rigolet, Makkovik, Postville, Hopedale, Natuashish and Nain with a return trip. On weekends, the vessel travels from Happy Valley-Goose Bay to Rigolet, Cartwright, Black Tickle and return.

As of January 1, 2019, Northern Ranger was taken out of service and decommissioned. The vessel was  replaced by a new ferry, that began sailing in early June 2019.

Notes

References

External links

 The original Northern Ranger photograph
 Photos from Shipspotting.com

Ferries of Newfoundland and Labrador
Marine Atlantic
1986 ships
Ships built in Ontario